"La Vie en rose" is a song closely associated with Édith Piaf.

La Vie en rose may also refer to:
 La Vie En Rose (album), 1989 album by D'erlanger
 "La Vie en Rose" (Iz*One song), 2018
 La Vie en rose (film), a biographical film about Édith Piaf
 La Vie en Rose (painting) , a 1979 artwork by Joan Mitchell

See also
 Boutique La Vie en Rose, a chain of lingerie stores
 Ma vie en rose (film)